This is the list of companies that manufacture cement in Tanzania.

 Dangote Industries Tanzania
 Lake Cement Limited
 Tanga Cement Plc
 Camel Cement Company
 Kilimanjaro Cement Limited
 Lee Building Materials Limited
 ARM Cement Tanzania Limited
 Mbeya Cement Company Limited
 Tanzania Portland Cement Limited
 Huaxin Cement MLL (Former Rhino cement)
 Sinoma and Hengya Cement Tanzania (In development)
 Mtwara Cement Limited
 Kisarawe Cement Company Limited.

Production
, Tanzania cement manufacturers were producing an estimated 2.8 million tonnes, with Tanzania Portland Cement Limited being the production leader, accounting for 36 percent of the total, followed by Tanga Cement Plc and Dangote Industries Tanzania. In addition to local production, Tanzania was projected to import as estimated 700,000 metric tonnes in 2016.

By December 2016, five new manufacturers had set up factories in the country, raising annual installed capacity to 10.8 metric tonnes, with total production in 2016, amounting to 7.1 million tonnes. Annual consumption in 2016 was 4.1 million tonnes, with the balance sold to regional neighbors, including Burundi and the Democratic Republic of the Congo.

See also

List of cement manufacturers in Rwanda
List of cement manufacturers in Uganda
List of companies and cities in Africa that manufacture cement

References

External links
 Tanzania: Cement industry news from Global Cement 
 Tanzania offers Dangote land to mine coal to fuel cement production As of 3 December 2017.

Cement companies of Tanzania
Tanzania
Cement manufacturers

Manufacturing in Tanzania